Malacoctenus tetranemus, the throatspotted blenny or chameleon clinid, is a species of labrisomid blenny native to the Pacific coast of the Americas from the Gulf of California to Peru as well as around the Galapagos Islands. This species can reach a length of  TL.

References

External links
 

tetranemus
Fish of Mexican Pacific coast
Fish described in 1877